The New Dam, a.k.a. Mahmud II Dam, is a historic dam located in Sarıyer district of Istanbul Province, Turkey.

The New Dam was built in 1830 by Ottoman Sultan Mahmud II (reigned 1808–1839).

The dam is situated next to Valide Dam north of Bahçeköy, Sarıyer inside the Bentler Nature Park, which is part of the Belgrad Forest.

It is a solid gravity dam constructed in masonry having a circular form.

References

Gravity dams
Dams in Istanbul Province
Dams completed in the 19th century
Buildings and structures of the Ottoman Empire
Sarıyer
Belgrad Forest
19th-century architecture in Turkey